Nembrotha aurea is a species of colourful sea slug, a dorid nudibranch, a marine gastropod mollusk in the family Polyceridae. It was first described in 2008.

Distribution
The type locality of this species is Msimbati, Mtwara Region, Tanzania. It is known from the western Indo-Pacific Ocean.

Description
Nembrotha aurea is a large creamy-yellow nembrothid that grows to at least 30 mm in length. The body is marked with brown longitudinal lines. The rhinophores are reddy-brown. The mantle is orange-red and the gill stalks and branches are white-electric blue while the gill pinnae are deep red.

Ecology
Nembrotha aurea eats colonial ascidians.

References

Polyceridae
Gastropods described in 2008